Jesús Manuel Cedenilla Moreno (born 13 February 1998) is a Spanish footballer who plays for CD Tudelano as a left back.

Club career
Born in Talavera de la Reina, Toledo, Castilla–La Mancha, Cedenilla joined Real Madrid's youth setup in 2006, from Azulejos Ramos FS. In August 2016, after overcoming a cancer, he joined Málaga CF.

On 16 January 2018, Cedenilla joined AD Alcorcón and was assigned to the reserves in the Tercera División. He made his senior debut twelve days later, coming on as a second-half substitute in a 5–0 away routing of CF San Agustín del Guadalix.

Cedenilla made his first team debut on 1 June 2019, starting in a 0–1 home loss against Gimnàstic de Tarragona in the Segunda División.

References

External links
  Manuel Cedenilla at Real Madrid
 Manuel Cedenilla at AD Alcorcón (archived) 
 
 
 

1998 births
Living people
People from Talavera de la Reina
Sportspeople from the Province of Toledo
Spanish footballers
Footballers from Castilla–La Mancha
Association football defenders
Segunda División players
Segunda División B players
Tercera División players
AD Alcorcón B players
AD Alcorcón footballers
Las Rozas CF players
CD Badajoz players